"We Are All Made of Stars" is a song by American electronica musician Moby. It was released as the first single from his sixth studio album, 18 (2002), on April 1, 2002. It reached number 11 on the UK Singles Chart and became a top-10 hit in several other European countries.

Background 
"We Are All Made of Stars" was written by Moby in New York after the September 11 attacks to express a sense of hopefulness. Moby has stated that the song was inspired by the song "Flowers" from the album Today by American alternative rock band Galaxie 500, as well as quantum physics in that "On a basic quantum level, all the matter in the universe is essentially made up of stardust." He disclosed the reason behind choosing the song as the lead single from the album:

Music video 
The song's music video, directed by Joseph Kahn, edited by David Blackburn and photographed by Brad Rushing, points out the excesses of the typical "Hollywood" lifestyle, showing celebrities in seedy environments, while Moby, an outsider to that world, portrays a spaceman. Celebrities who make appearances in the video include Kato Kaelin, Verne Troyer, Corey Feldman, Todd Bridges, Gary Coleman, JC Chasez, Dave Navarro, Sean Bean, Dominique Swain, Ron Jeremy, Thora Birch, Tommy Lee, Molly Sims, Ritchie Blackmore, Angelyne, The Toxic Avenger, Leelee Sobieski, Sgt. Kabukiman N.Y.P.D., and Robert Evans. The atmosphere of the video was inspired by photographs by Philip-Lorca diCorcia. The theme and some of the imagery also derives from the 1968 film and novel 2001: A Space Odyssey, particularly the Star Child motif ("We are all stars") and Moby's appearance throughout much of the video wearing a space suit.

The video won the MTV Video Music Award for Best Cinematography at the 2002 MTV Video Music Awards.

Track listings 

 US 2×12-inch single 
A1. "We Are All Made of Stars"  – 7:03
A2. "We Are All Made of Stars"  – 5:28
B1. "We Are All Made of Stars"  – 8:06
B2. "We Are All Made of Stars"  – 3:31
C1. "We Are All Made of Stars"  – 7:56
D1. "We Are All Made of Stars"  – 6:30
D2. "We Are All Made of Stars"  – 6:25

 UK and Australian CD1 
 "We Are All Made of Stars"
 "Landing"
 "Soul to Love"

 UK and Australian CD2 
 "We Are All Made of Stars" 
 "We Are All Made of Stars" 
 "We Are All Made of Stars" 

 UK 12-inch single 
A1. "We Are All Made of Stars" 
B1. "We Are All Made of Stars" 
B2. "We Are All Made of Stars" 

 UK cassette single 
 "We Are All Made of Stars"
 "Landing"
 "We Are All Made of Stars" 

 European CD single 
 "We Are All Made of Stars"
 "Landing"

 Japanese CD single 
 "We Are All Made of Stars" 
 "Landing"
 "We Are All Made of Stars"

Charts

Release history

References

External links 
 

2002 singles
2002 songs
Moby songs
Music videos directed by Joseph Kahn
Mute Records singles
Songs written by Moby
V2 Records singles